Padmaja Venugopal (born 1961) is an Indian politician from Kerala and daughter of Congress leader K. Karunakaran. She currently serves as one of the general secretaries of Kerala Pradesh Congress Committee.

References 

Women in Kerala politics
Indian National Congress politicians from Kerala
1961 births
Living people